Drinomyia is a genus of flies in the family Tachinidae.

Species
 D. hokkaidensis (Baranov, 1935)

References

Diptera of Asia
Exoristinae
Monotypic Brachycera genera
Tachinidae genera